Charisma compacta is a species of extremely small sea snail, a marine gastropod mollusk in the family Trochidae, the top snails.

Description
The height of the shell attains 1.9 mm, its diameter 2 mm. The shell is solid and has a turbinate shape. Its colour is pale cream. The four whorls are rather loosely coiled and separated by channelled sutures. The spire-whorls are smooth. The body whorl is sculptured with about twenty regularly spaced, sharp, spiral grooves. The umbilicus measures about one-eighth of the shell's diameter; its margin is smooth and rounded. The aperture-side of the umbilicus shows an obscure funicle. The circular aperture of the shell is descending. The inner lip is slightly expanded. The outer lip is simple.

Distribution
This marine species is endemic to Australia and occurs off New South Wales.

References

 Laseron, C. 1954. Revision of the Liotiidae of New South Wales. The Australian Zoologist 12(1): 1-25, figs 1-49a
 Iredale, T. & McMichael, D.F. 1962. A reference list of the marine Mollusca of New South Wales. Memoirs of the Australian Museum 11: 1-109 
 Wilson, B. 1993. Australian Marine Shells. Prosobranch Gastropods. Kallaroo, Western Australia : Odyssey Publishing Vol. 1 408 pp

External links
 World Register of Marine Species
 

compacta
Gastropods of Australia
Gastropods described in 1915